Saint-Paul-Trois-Châteaux Cathedral (French: Cathédrale Notre-Dame-et-Saint-Paul de Saint-Paul-Trois-Châteaux or Cathédrale Notre-Dame de Saint-Paul-Trois-Châteaux) is a former Roman Catholic church located in the town of Saint-Paul-Trois-Châteaux, France. It was a national monument.

It was formerly the seat of the Bishop of Saint-Paul-Trois-Châteaux. The diocese (sometimes, like the town, also known as Saint-Paul-en-Tricastin) was created in either the 4th or the 6th century and was abolished under the Concordat of 1801, when its territory was divided between the Diocese of Avignon and the Diocese of Valence, known since 1911 as the Diocese of Valence (–Die–Saint-Paul-Trois-Châteaux).

Building history

The present cathedral was built in the 12th-13th centuries and replaced an earlier one, of which some mosaics survive. It is in the Provençal Romanesque style, of which it is a particularly fine example, reusing Roman building materials.

Sources
 Catholic Hierarchy: Diocese of Saint-Paul-Trois-Châteaux
 
 Art-Roman.net: Saint-Paul-Trois-Châteaux

External links

 Picture of Saint-Paul-Trois-Châteaux Cathedral

Former cathedrals in France
Churches in Drôme